The Bayer designations n Velorum and N Velorum are distinct. Due to technical limitations, both designations link here. For the star

n Velorum, see HD 74272 (HR 3452)
N Velorum, see HD 82668 (HR 3803)

Velorum, n
Vela (constellation)